Aitoliko railway station (Sidirodromikos Stathmos Etolikou) was a railway station in the town of Aitoliko in Aetolia-Acarnania, Greece.

History
The station took its name from the town that it served, and it was located east of the island which contains the town centre of Aitoliko.  Construction was completed by the Northwestern Greece Railways in October 1890, it later marked the starting point of the rail line with Katochi which was used between 1912 and 1943 when that line was shut down.  The station closed down in 1972 along with the entire Kryoneri-Agrinio Line.  It had one platform, its newer station was renovated in 2003.

Services
The station served two rail lines:
Kryoneri–Agrinio railway, at km 26.890 from Kryoneri Limena.
Aitoliko–Katochi railway, the starting point of the line

References
 
 

Railway stations in Western Greece
Railway stations opened in 1890
Railway stations closed in 1972
Buildings and structures in Aetolia-Acarnania